Domenico Caprioli (1494–1528) was an Italian painter born at Treviso in 1494. He produced portraits in the style of Giorgione.

Life
Caprioli was the son-in-law and pupil of Pier Maria Pennacchi and arose to prominence in the early 16th Century during the High Renaissance. In addition to portrait works, he painted numerous altarpieces. He was murdered at the age of 34 by his wife's stepfather, allegedly following a years-long dispute over her dowry. Several portraits attributed to him survive today, some of which are on display at the Hermitage, Bowes, and Gemäldegalerie museums.

Gallery

References

 

1494 births
1528 deaths
People from Treviso
15th-century Italian painters
Italian male painters
16th-century Italian painters
Painters from Venice
Italian Renaissance painters